Carnegie Hall is a 1947 American musical drama film directed by Edgar G. Ulmer and starring Marsha Hunt and William Prince.  The film was produced by Federal Films and released by United Artists.

Ulmer directed Carnegie Hall with the help of conductor Fritz Reiner, godfather of Ulmer's daughter Arianné. The New York City concert venue Carnegie Hall serves as the film's setting for the plot and performances. A tribute to classical music and Carnegie Hall, the film features appearances by some of the prominent music figures of the 20th century. Based on a story by silent movie actress Seena Owen, Carnegie Hall follows the life of Irish immigrant Nora Ryan who arrives in the U.S. just as the grand concert hall is opened in 1891, and her life is intertwined with the performers, conductors, aspiring artists and employees who work there. The plot serves as a thread to connect the music performances.

Plot
Nora, a dresser at Carnegie Hall, is cleaning in preparation for the next evening's concert. Walter Damrosch is rehearsing his Symphony Society of New York in Tchaikovsky's Piano Concerto No. 1. Substitute pianist Tony Salerno begins deliberately changing the accents and rhythms to fit his own interpretation and after a tense exchange, Tony walks off the stage. Nora entreats Tony to apologize to Damrosch, who had admitted her to a Carnegie Hall performance when she was a child.

Nora and Tony are soon married, and a baby arrives. One night after an argument with Nora, a drunk Tony falls down the stairs and is killed. Several years later, Tony, Jr. is a promising piano player, and Nora takes a job to finance his musical training. As Tony reaches adulthood, he shows a tendency to improvise when playing classical music. He falls for Ruth, a backup singer with Vaughn Monroe's big-band orchestra, and Monroe offers Tony a job with his band. Nora beseeches Tony to decline Monroe's offer because he is a classical artist and not just another popular musician. However, he refuses to accept that playing with Monroe would compromise his standards.

Years pass and Tony has become a successful recording artist but remains estranged from his mother. Ruth informs Nora that Tony left her suddenly after an argument. Nora seizes the opportunity to reconcile with her son and plans to fly to Chicago with Ruth. However, Tony tricks them into coming to Carnegie Hall to see him. They are surprised when Tony leads the orchestra, and the audience cheers. Tony smiles from the stage at Nora and Ruth.

Cast
Marsha Hunt as Nora Ryan
William Prince as Tony Salerno Jr.
Frank McHugh as John Donovan
Martha O'Driscoll as Ruth Hainess
Hans Jaray as Tony Salerno Sr.
Joseph Buloff as Anton Tribik
Alfonso D'Artega as Tchaikovsky
Cloris Leachman as Dancing Nightclub Patron – Vaughn Monroe sequence (uncredited)
Barbara Woodell as Nellie – Irish Charwoman (uncredited)

Music guests
 Walter Damrosch (conductor)
 Olin Downes (music critic)
 Jascha Heifetz (violinist)
 Harry James (trumpeter)
 Vaughn Monroe (band leader)
 Jan Peerce (vocalist)
 Gregor Piatigorsky (cellist)
 Ezio Pinza (vocalist)
 Lily Pons (vocalist)
 Fritz Reiner (conductor)
 Artur Rodziński (conductor)
 Arthur Rubinstein (pianist)
 Risë Stevens (vocalist)
 Leopold Stokowski (conductor)
 Bruno Walter (conductor)
 New York Philharmonic Quintet (John Corigliano Sr., William Lincer, Nadia Reisenberg, Leonard Rose, Michael Rosenker)

Music

 Richard Wagner – Prelude from Die Meistersinger von Nürnberg – New York Philharmonic, Bruno Walter, conductor
 Léo Delibes – "Bell Song" from opera Lakmé – sung by Lily Pons
 Camille Saint-Saëns – "The Swan" from The Carnival of the Animals – Gregor Piatigorsky, cello
 Georges Bizet – "Seguidilla" from Carmen – sung by Risë Stevens (mezzo-soprano)
 Ludwig van Beethoven – Symphony No. 5 (excerpts) – New York Philharmonic, Artur Rodziński, conductor
 Frédéric Chopin – Polonaise héroïque – Arthur Rubinstein, piano
 Manuel de Falla – "Ritual Fire Dance" – Arthur Rubinstein, piano
 Eduardo di Capua – "’O sole mio" – sung by Jan Peerce (tenor)
 Giuseppe Verdi – "Il lacerato spirito" from Simon Boccanegra – sung by Ezio Pinza (bass)
 Wolfgang Amadeus Mozart – "Fin ch'han dal vino" from Don Giovanni – sung by Ezio Pinza (bass)
 Sam Coslow – "Beware, My Heart" – sung by Vaughn Monroe
 Frank L. Ryerson/Wilton Moore – "The Pleasure's All Mine" – sung by Vaughn Monroe
 Pyotr Ilyich Tchaikovsky – Violin Concerto in D major, first movement – New York Philharmonic, Fritz Reiner, conductor, Jasha Heifetz, violin
 Pyotr Ilyich Tchaikovsky – Symphony No. 5, second movement – New York Philharmonic, Leopold Stokowski, conductor
 Hal Borne – "Brown Danube" – sung by Harry James
 Mischa Portnoff – "The 57th Street Rhapsody" (composed for the film) – pianist uncertain; Portnoff's hands are filmed playing the climactic piece.

References

External links
 
 
 "Carnegie Hall, in Which an Array of Musical Talent Is Seen, Has Dual Premiere – Two Other Films Arrive" by Bosley Crowther, The New York Times, May 3, 1947

1947 films
1940s musical drama films
American black-and-white films
American musical drama films
Carnegie Hall
Films about classical music and musicians
Films directed by Edgar G. Ulmer
Films set in concert halls
Films set in New York City
Films shot in New York City
United Artists films
Cultural depictions of Pyotr Ilyich Tchaikovsky
1947 drama films
1940s English-language films
1940s American films